Gmina Jabłonna may refer to either of the following rural administrative districts in Poland:
Gmina Jabłonna, Masovian Voivodeship
Gmina Jabłonna, Lublin Voivodeship